Athletics events were held at the 2009 Island Games in Åland, Finland, from June 27–July 4, 2009. For the 13th edition of the Games, 25 teams competed in 15 different sports.

Men's events

Women’s events

References

External links
Official Website
Athletics results

2009
Island Games
2009 Island Games